Hetaerininae is a subfamily of broad-winged damselflies in the family Calopterygidae. There are at least 4 genera and more than 70 described species in Hetaerininae.

Genera
These four genera belong to the subfamily Hetaerininae:
 Bryoplathanon Garrison, 2006
 Hetaerina Hagen, 1853 (rubyspots)
 Mnesarete Cowley, 1934
 Ormenophlebia Garrison, 2006

References

Further reading

 
 
 
 

Calopterygidae